Karate High School was an American rock band formed in San Francisco, California in 2004 by frontman, multi-instrumentalist and producer Paul McGuire. On March 21, 2006, the band released their debut album, Arcade Rock. Karate High School's second album, The League Of Tomorrow, was released on September 4, 2007, which further honed the band's layered, keyboard-driven style of alternative rock. On November 11, 2008, Karate High School announced that they had signed to Eyeball Records, and would release a new record entitled Invaders on May 19, 2009. In early 2010 Paul McGuire announced that he was done producing music under the name Karate High School and has since chosen to go into other studies.

History
Paul McGuire formed the band in 2004, and the band's name came from McGuire's love for "really cheesy B-rated horror movies" and came up with a name that sounded like them.

Musical style
Karate High School's style evolved over the last three records. Once described as an "aggressive blend of poppy punk, hyper post-hardcore, and eight-bit blips"; the band began as a spazzy, catchy, keyboard-driven rock act on their debut record, but grew and matured over the course of three records to a sound that crosses the genres of rock, punk, experimental, electronica, and power-pop. Their sound has often been referred to as synthcore. While 2007's The League of Tomorrow effortlessly gear-shifted through poppy, upbeat melodies to heavy electronica-fused pop-punk, their 2009 album Invaders focused on all of the aforementioned elements and further evolved the band's sound. The band's sound has also been called Nintendocore, but the band doesn't consider itself under the genre.

Band members

Karate High School was the songwriting project of Paul McGuire, and he wrote all the music and lyrics for the band. Ray Bautista joined the group as the keyboard player, and was the only member to be in the band since Arcade Rock. For recording purposes, Paul produced all three records and played all the instruments on The League Of Tomorrow. During the recording of Invaders, Geoff Garnett played guitar, Aaron McVeigh played drums, and Paul McGuire played keyboards, bass, and sang. In 2010, Paul McGuire announced that he was done producing music under the name Karate High School.

Former members and touring lineup
 Paul McGuire - vocals, keyboards, guitar, bass, producer 
 Gabe Ausiello - guitar 
 Sean Martin - drums 
 Paul Kriz - bass 
 Danny Glaspy - drums 
 Ken Kaiser - bass 
 Tom Evans - bass 
 Dan Kingdon - bass 
 Nathan Vega - bass 
 Gideon Naude - bass 
 Aaron McVeigh - drums 
 Geoff Garnett - guitar 
 Ray Bautista - keyboard 

Timeline

Discography

Studio albums

Extended plays

Singles

Music videos

Compilation appearances
 2006 - Rising Stars 3
 Features the track "Good News And Bad News"

 2007 - Leak Volume #3
 Features the track "Burning Up For You"

 2007 - @United Vol.4 - Mash-Up Rock Show
 Features the track "Burning Up For You"

 Unknown - [Just Listen To This]
 Features the track "Good News And Bad News"

References

External links

 
 Paul McGuire official website
 
 
 
 Invaders Review

Musical groups from San Francisco
Musical groups established in 2004
Musical groups disestablished in 2010
American post-hardcore musical groups
Nintendocore musical groups
American pop punk groups
Pop punk groups from California
Chiptune musical groups